Pseudopancovia is a genus of flowering plants belonging to the family Sapindaceae.

Its native range is Western Central Tropical Africa.

Species:
 Pseudopancovia heteropetala Pellegr.

References

Sapindaceae
Sapindaceae genera